Sekun is a village in Kovel Raion, Volyn Oblast, Ukraine.

Until 18 July 2020, Sekun belonged to Stara Vyzhivka Raion. The raion was abolished in July 2020 as part of the administrative reform of Ukraine, which reduced the number of raions of Volyn Oblast to four. The area of Stara Vyzhivka Raion was merged into Kovel Raion.

Demographics
Native language as of the Ukrainian Census of 2001:
 Ukrainian 99.15%
 Russian 0.51%
 Belarusian 0.34%

Notable people
Dara Korniy (born 1970), writer

References

External links

Villages in Kovel Raion